The 1963 Orange Bowl   was the 29th edition of the college football bowl game, played at the Orange Bowl in Miami, Florida, on Tuesday, January 1. Part of the 1962–63 bowl game season, it matched the fifth-ranked Alabama Crimson Tide of the Southeastern Conference and the #8 Oklahoma Sooners of the Big Eight Conference. With President John F. Kennedy and First Lady Jacqueline Kennedy in attendance, Alabama shut out the Sooners 17–0.

Teams

Oklahoma

Alabama

Game summary
Alabama's Richard Williamson scored in the first quarter on 25-yard touchdown pass from sophomore quarterback Joe Namath to take a 7–0 lead. A 15-yard Cotton Clark touchdown run in the second quarter extended the lead to 14–0.

In the third quarter, Alabama scored their final points after Tim Davis hit a 19-yard field goal. Lee Roy Jordan recorded an Alabama bowl record of 31 tackles in the victory. The fourth quarter was scoreless.

References

External links
 1963 Orange Bowl, #5 Alabama vs #8 Oklahoma (Highlights) via YouTube

1962–63 NCAA football bowl games
1963
1963
1963
January 1963 sports events in the United States
Orange Bowl